Elections to Cumnock and Doon Valley District Council were held on 7 May 1974, on the same day as the other Scottish local government elections. This was the first election to the district council following the implementation of the Local Government (Scotland) Act 1973.

The election used 10 wards created by the Formation Electoral Arrangements in 1974. Each ward elected one councillor using first-past-the-post voting.

Labour took control of the council after winning a large majority despite none of their candidates winning a contested seat. Labour were the only party to stand candidates in every seat with eight elected unopposed. The two seats which were contested were won by the Conservatives and an independent Labour candidate. As a result of the large number of uncontested seats, independent Labour won the popular vote.

Background
Prior to 1974, Cumnock (known as Cumnock and Holmhead until 1960) was one of 17 burghs within the County of Ayr. The area was made a burgh of barony by Royal Charter in 1509 before becoming a police burgh with an elected burgh council in 1866. As a small burgh, the burgh council had limited powers which included some control over planning as well as local taxation, building control, housing, lighting and drainage with the rest of the local government responsibility falling to the county council.

Following the recommendations in the Wheatly Report, the old system of counties and burghs – which had resulted in a mishmash of local government areas in which some small burghs had larger populations but far fewer responsibilities than some large burghs and even counties – was to be replaced by a new system of regional and district councils. Cumnock Burgh and the surrounding areas including New Cumnock, Mauchline and Dalmellington was to be placed in Cumnock and Doon Valley district within the Strathclyde region.

Results

Source:

Ward results

Cumnock Burgh

Lugar, Logan and Muirkirk

Old Cumnock Parish

Auchinleck

Catrine and Sorn

New Cumnock

Dalmellington

Patna and Dalrymple

Drongan, Ochiltree, Rankinston and Stair

Mauchline

References

1974 Scottish local elections
1974